Thunderhawk is a wooden roller coaster with an out-and-back layout located at Dorney Park & Wildwater Kingdom in Allentown, Pennsylvania. Originally opening as The Coaster in 1924, Thunderhawk is the oldest operating roller coaster in the Cedar Fair chain and one of the oldest in the world still in operation. It was manufactured by Philadelphia Toboggan Coasters and designed by Herbert Paul Schmeck, who studied under the legendary John A. Miller and went on to mentor another renowned designer, John C. Allen.

History
Thunderhawk was designed by Herbert Paul Schmeck and built by the Philadelphia Toboggan Coasters. When Thunderhawk opened on March 30,1924 and for many years after the ride was known simply as the Coaster. The Coaster was renamed Thunderhawk with the addition of the Hercules roller coaster to the park in 1989.

Originally, the Coaster was built as an out-and-back coaster, meaning it went straight out from the first drop, turned around and came straight back. The ride was reconfigured in 1930 to its present design with a figure-eight twister section in the middle of the ride. Over the years, the ride has seen many cosmetic changes. At one point the ride featured a bright yellow paint job, which has since been painted over with an off-white color.

The original station pavilion featured a separate bumper car ride, around which wrapped the line for the Coaster, providing some entertainment to those waiting in line. Originally, the ride began with a tunneled section and ended with another tunneled section, as the train went under the portion of the pavilion devoted to the bumper cars. However, the bumper cars were removed following Cedar Fair's purchase of the park in 1993, leaving the tunnel that began the ride as an open concrete trench. In addition, a set of brakes was placed in the middle of the return bunny hills causing the train to slow down and lose much of its trademark airtime.

The Thunderhawk structure was maintained by carpenter Paul Hottenstein, nicknamed "Shorty," from 1961 until his sudden death in the winter of 2001. A plaque in the ride's station honors him and his work on the ride.

Thunderhawk continues to be one of the park's most popular and beloved rides. To this day, it remains a classic example of an early American wooden roller coaster.

For the 2016 season, Dorney Park announced major renovations to Thunderhawk. Among the changes were new trains designed by Philadelphia Toboggan Coasters, featuring an open-air design, with individual ratcheting lap bars (as opposed to the previous "buzz bars"). The ride also received a new coat of white paint, reminiscent of the coaster's original color, and a new white lighting package to outline the entire ride.

In 2021, the American Coaster Enthusiasts gave Thunderhawk an ACE Coaster Landmark plaque.

Incidents

On July 21, 1990, two cars on Thunderhawk collided at the bottom of the lift hill. 17 people were taken to local hospitals to receive treatment for minor injuries. It is unknown what caused the accident, as certified ride operators tested the ride after the accident and found nothing mechanically or physically wrong with it; however, it is said that operator error may have caused the accident. The ride was closed immediately after the accident happened and re-opened the next day.

References

External links

Official page

Roller coasters operated by Cedar Fair
Roller coasters in Pennsylvania